is a double leg  takedown adopted later by the Kodokan into their Shinmeisho-no-waza (newly accepted techniques) list. It is categorized as a hand technique,  te waza.

Variations 

Whereas morote gari is a frontal attack,
The Canon Of Judo
describes soto morote as a hanmi-irimi technique,
where tori is on uke's side.

References

Further reading
 Ohlenkamp, Neil (2006)  Judo Unleashed  .

External links
Morote Gari  
双手刈 / Morote-gari 

Judo technique